Lizeth Rueda Santos (born March 7, 1994) is a Mexican distance swimmer. At the 2012 Summer Olympics, she competed in the Women's marathon 10 kilometre, finishing in 21st place. She was born in Guadalajara.

Sporting Events

References

Mexican female swimmers
1994 births
Living people
Olympic swimmers of Mexico
Swimmers at the 2012 Summer Olympics
Female long-distance swimmers
Swimmers at the 2011 Pan American Games
Pan American Games competitors for Mexico
21st-century Mexican women